Ryan Joseph Bourriaque is an American politician serving as a member of the Louisiana House of Representatives from the 47th district. Elected in November 2018, he assumed office in 2019.

Early life and education 
Bourriaque is a native of Grand Chenier, Louisiana. He earned a Bachelor of Science degree in psychology and a Master of Science in resource economics and environmental policy from Louisiana State University.

Career 
From 2008 to 2010, Bourriaque served as an assistant planner in the Cameron Parish Planning and Development Office. He later worked as a grants planner for Minvielle & Associates in Abbeville, Louisiana. Since 2012, he has worked as an administrator for the Cameron Parish Police Jury. He was elected to the Louisiana House of Representatives in November 2018 and assumed office in 2019.

References 

Living people
People from Cameron Parish, Louisiana
Louisiana State University alumni
People from Abbeville, Louisiana
Republican Party members of the Louisiana House of Representatives
Year of birth missing (living people)